2008 Football West State League took place in Australia, organized by Association football. The State League was won by the Western Knight .

Pre-season changes

Table

Finals

Ref:

Awards

Fairest & Best
 A. Naglieri – Perth SC

Footballwa.net Player of the Year
 A. Brown – Mandurah City

Goalkeeper of the Year
 Phil Straker – Stirling Lions

Referee of the Year
 David Currie

Top scorer
 P. O'Callaghan – Mandurah City – 25

References

2008
2008 in Australian soccer